Edwin John Ellis (1848–1916) was a British poet and illustrator. He is now remembered mostly for the three-volume collection of the works of William Blake he edited with W. B. Yeats. It is now criticised, however, for weak scholarship, and preconceptions.

Life
Ellis was a son of Alexander John Ellis. He was a long-term friend of John Butler Yeats, sharing an interest in aesthetics, and from 1869 a London studio in Newman Street; but was not on good terms with Susan his wife.

Ellis was in an association with John Trivett Nettleship, and Sydney Hall, also followers of Blake, as well as John Butler Yeats and George Wilson (1848–1890, a Scottish Pre-Raphaelite inspired artist). Called The Brotherhood, the group was set up in 1869, with Hall leaving early.

When the Yeats family moved to Bedford Park in London, which occurred in 1879, Ellis met the son William Butler Yeats. W. B. Yeats became close to the "vague and depressive" Ellis in 1888. Their joint study of Blake began in 1889, and resulted in a major textual discovery, the manuscript of Vala, or the Four Zoas.

Ellis took part in the gatherings of the Rhymers' Club, and contributed to their anthologies. R. F. Foster describes his relationship to W. B. Yeats as that of a collaborator, repaid as other rhymers or mentors were by inclusion in Yeats's Oxford Book of Modern Verse 1892–1935.

Works
Fate in Arcadia, and other poems 1892 
Facsimile of the original outlines before colouring of the Songs of Innocence and of Experience executed by William Blake 1893
The works of William Blake, poetic, symbolic and critical 1893 (with W B Yeats)
The Real Blake; a portrait biography, 1907
Seen in Three Days
Sancan the Bard

Family
Ellis was married, with a German wife who died around 1922.

References

External links

19th-century British poets
1848 births
1916 deaths
British male poets